Lynnhurst is a neighborhood in the Southwest community in Minneapolis, Minnesota. Its boundaries are 46th Street to the north, Lyndale Avenue to the east, 54th Street to the south, and Penn Avenue to the west. It is located along the southeastern shore of Lake Harriet. Outflows from the lake run through a parkway for several city blocks to reach Minnehaha Creek.

Public schools in the neighborhood include Burroughs Community School. The Lynnhurst Recreation Center,  part of the Minneapolis parks system, includes a gymnasium, meeting rooms, and other facilities; nearby Lynnhurst Park includes baseball and softball fields, a playground, and tennis courts. Washburn Library, a branch of the Hennepin County Library system, stands next to Minnehaha Creek near the southeast corner of the district. Houses of worship include Shir Tikvah and Mount Olivet Lutheran Church. Shops and restaurants are clustered near the eastern edge of the district. Metro Transit provides bus service on neighborhood thoroughfares.

The Lynnhurst Neighborhood Association holds meetings each month at the Lynnhurst Recreation Center.

References

External links 
 Minneapolis Neighborhood Profile - Lynnhurst
 Lynnhurst Neighborhood Association

Neighborhoods in Minneapolis